The Pittsburgh Cougars are a currently dormant junior ice hockey team. The Cougars play their home games at the Iceoplex at Southpointe near Canonsburg, Pennsylvania.

Franchise History
The team was originally known as the Traverse City Enforcers playing in Traverse City, Michigan as a member of the now defunct Continental Elite Hockey League from 2001 until the league folded in 2004. The TC Enforcers home arena was Centre Ice. In the 2002–2003 season, Scott Gardiner, head coach of the Enforcers, won CEHL coach of the year. In the same season, Goaltender Aaron  Walski was named league rookie of the year.

The team was resurrected in 2007 as a member of the America East Hockey League. The team finished their first season with only 9 wins, 35 losses and 6 ties. After the 2007–2008 season in the AEHL the management announced a move to the new United Junior Hockey League. The team joined the UJHL in Fall 2008.

The franchise became the Pittsburgh Cougars in 2009 and are currently dormant.

References

External links
Official Site
UJHL Site
AEHL Site

Defunct ice hockey teams in Pennsylvania
Ice hockey teams in Pittsburgh
Canonsburg, Pennsylvania
2009 establishments in Pennsylvania
Ice hockey clubs established in 2009